Shaun O'Leary (born 13 March 1958) is a New Zealand judoka. He competed in the men's lightweight event at the 1984 Summer Olympics.

References

External links
 

1958 births
Living people
New Zealand male judoka
Olympic judoka of New Zealand
Judoka at the 1984 Summer Olympics
Sportspeople from Auckland